Mi Saxophone is the first full-length album released by the New Mexico music performer Al Hurricane in 1968.

Track listing

References

Al Hurricane albums
1968 debut albums
New Mexico music albums